HMS Swordfish (61S) was a first-batch S-class submarine built for the Royal Navy during the 1930s. Commissioned in 1932, she was given the pennant number 61S and was assigned to the 2nd Submarine Flotilla.

At the start of World War II, Swordfish was missed with three torpedoes by her sister ship  after being mistaken for a German U-boat. On 20 April 1940, she attacked a German convoy, but her torpedoes failed to hit their targets. Two days later, she sighted another convoy, but did not attack it because of the ships' shallow draught. In the morning of 26 April, she dived to avoid drifting mines; one of them hit but did not explode. During her sixth war patrol, Swordfish was mistakenly bombed by a British aircraft, but sustained no damage. Swordfish disappeared during her twelfth patrol, after departing Portsmouth on 7 November. Although she was initially thought to have been sunk by German destroyers off Brest, she was determined to have been sunk by a mine when her wreck was discovered by diver Martin Woodward in June 1983 off the Isle of Wight. She had left Portsmouth Harbour only hours before, and it is assumed that she was carrying out a trim dive when she struck the German mine.

Design and description
The S-class submarines were designed as successors to the L class and were intended to operate in the North and Baltic Seas. They displaced  on the surface and  submerged. The S-class submarines had a crew of 38 officers and ratings.

For surface running, the boats were powered by two  diesel engines, each driving one propeller shaft. When submerged each propeller was driven by a  electric motor. They could reach  on the surface and  underwater.

The boats were armed with six  torpedo tubes in the bow. They carried six reload torpedoes for a grand total of a dozen torpedoes. They were also armed with a  deck gun.

Construction and career
Swordfish was ordered on 2 July 1930 and was laid down by Chatham Dockyard on 1 December that same year. The submarine was launched on 10 November 1931 and commissioned on 28 November 1932.

At the onset of World War II, Swordfish was a member of the 2nd Submarine Flotilla. From 23 to 26 August 1939 the 2nd Submarine Flotilla moved to their war bases at Dundee and Blyth.

On 1 September, the day the war started, Swordfish departed Dundee for her first war patrol, southwest of Stavanger, Norway. On 14 September, southeast of Aberdeen, Scotland in position 56°22'N, 01°28'W, she was mistaken for a U-boat by her sister ship , which fired three torpedoes. Swordfish dived and the torpedoes missed. On 23 September she left Dundee for her second patrol, west of Denmark. Between 3 October 1939 and 13 March 1940, she refitted in Dundee, then conducted training exercises. On 22 March, she left port for another patrol, in the western approach to the Skagerrak strait. Swordfish sighted only neutral ships during this patrol and returned to Blyth on 8 April.

Swordfish departed Blyth again on 16 April for another patrol in the Skagerrak. On 20 April, she sighted and attacked a German convoy, made up of Three heavy transports and four escorts in position . Her torpedoes missed, but Swordfish was attacked with depth charges until the evening by the convoy's escorts. Two days later, she sighted another convoy of trawlers and escorts but did not attack them due to their shallow draught, which would have caused the torpedoes to run under the ships. In the morning of 26 April, Swordfish sighted several drifting mines coming towards her; one of these struck as Swordfish was diving, but failed to explode. Swordfish returned to Blyth two days later, ending her fourth patrol.

Swordfish conducted an uneventful patrol from 10 to 25 May in the North Sea. On 5 June, she departed Blyth for her sixth war patrol in the North Sea. The next day, she was bombed in error by a Lockheed Hudson of No. 224 Squadron RAF, but no damage was sustained. After returning to Blyth, Swordfish conducted another patrol, but only aircraft were sighted. On her eighth patrol, she same across the yacht Maski, which was fleeing to the United Kingdom. After taking in the yacht's crew, Swordfish sank it with gunfire. She then conducted a tenth and eleventh patrol, missing several ships with torpedoes.

Nothing was heard from her following her departure from Portsmouth on 7 November 1940 with 40 crew on board to relieve  which was on patrol off the Western Approaches near Brest, France. At the time it was thought that she had been sunk by a German destroyer. However she was discovered by a local diver in 1983, split into two just forward of the gun by a mine. The wreck lies in about 46 metres of water roughly 12 miles south of St. Catherine's Point, Isle of Wight in position . It is likely that she struck the mine shortly after sailing whilst carrying out a trim dive. The wreck site is designated as a protected place under the Protection of Military Remains Act 1986.

References

Citations

Sources
  
 
 
 
 
 

 

World War II shipwrecks in the English Channel
British S-class submarines (1931)
Maritime incidents in November 1940
Lost submarines of the United Kingdom
1931 ships
World War II submarines of the United Kingdom
Ships sunk by mines
Ships lost with all hands